The University of Auckland Faculty of Creative Arts and Industries, formerly known as the National Institute of Creative Arts and Industries (NICAI) is one of nine faculties that make up the University of Auckland.

Departments 
 School of Architecture and Planning 
 Elam School of Fine Arts 
 Dance Studies Programme 
 School of Music

Degrees

Undergraduate 
 Bachelor of Architectural Studies (BAS)
 Bachelor of Dance Studies (BDanceSt)
 Bachelor of Fine Arts (BFA)
 Bachelor of Music (BMus)
 Bachelor of Urban Planning (Honours) (BUrbPlan(Hons))

Postgraduate 
Architecture, Urban Planning, Urban Design and Heritage Conservation:
 Master of Architecture (Professional) (MArch (Prof))
 Master of Urban Planning (MUrbPlan)
 Postgraduate Diploma in Architecture (PGDipArch)
 Master of Architecture (MArch)
 Master of Architecture (MArch) in Sustainable Design
 Master of Planning (MPlan)
 Doctor of Philosophy (PhD) – Architecture
 Doctor of Philosophy (PhD) – Planning
 Doctor of Philosophy (PhD) – Urban Design
 Master of Urban Design (MUrbDes)
 Master of Heritage Conservation (MHerCons)
 Master of Architecture (Professional) and Heritage Conservation (MArch(Prof)HerCons) 
 Master of Architecture (Professional) and Urban Design (MArch(Prof)UrbDes)
 Master of Architecture (Professional) and Urban Planning (Professional) (MArch(Prof)UrbPlan(Prof))
 Master of Urban Planning (Professional) and Heritage Conservation (MUrbPlan(Prof)HerCons)
 Master of Urban Planning (Professional) and Urban Design (MUrbPlan(Prof)UrbDes)
Dance Studies:
 Bachelor of Dance Studies (Honours) (BDanceSt(Hons)
 Postgraduate Diploma in Dance Studies (PGDipDanceSt)
 Master of Dance Studies (MDanceSt)
 Master of Community Dance (MCommDance)
 Doctor of Philosophy (PhD)
Fine Arts:
 Bachelor of Fine Arts (Honours) (BFA (Hons))
 Postgraduate Diploma in Fine Arts (PGDipFA)
 Master of Fine Arts (MFA)
 Doctor of Fine Arts (DocFA)
 Doctor of Philosophy (PhD)
Music:
 Master of Music (MMus)
 Doctor of Music (DMus)
 Doctor of Musical Arts (DMA)
 Doctor of Philosophy (PhD)
 Bachelor of Music with Honours (BMus(Hons))
 Postgraduate Diploma in Music (PGDipMus)
 Graduate Diploma in Music (GradDipMus)

External links 
 Official website of the Faculty of Creative Arts and Industries

References 

Creative Arts and Industries, Faculty of